Anil Baijal is a retired Central Government  Civil Servant of the Indian Administrative Service cadre and served as the 21st Lieutenant Governor of Delhi. He took over office on 31 December 2016 after the sudden resignation of Najeeb Jung. He suddenly resigned from the post of Lieutenant Governor & sent his resignation letter to President of India on 18 May 2022.

Early life and education 
Baijal holds a master's degree in arts from the University of Allahabad and a master's degree in development economics from the University of East Anglia.

Career 
Baijal is a 1969 batch IAS officer from the AGMUT (Arunachal Pradesh-Goa-Mizoram and Union Territory) cadre. He has served as Union Home Secretary under the Atal Bihari Vajpayee government. During his tenure as Union Home Secretary, he removed Kiran Bedi from her post as the head of jails accusing her of breaking every clause in the jail manual. He has also served as the Chairman of Delhi Development Authority; Chief Secretary of Andaman & Nicobar Islands; additional Home Secretary in the Ministry of Information and Broadcasting; MD of Indian Airlines; CEO of Prasar Bharati; Development Commissioner of Goa; Commissioner (Sales Tax and Excise) of Delhi; Councilor in Charge of India Aid Mission in Nepal. He was responsible for the introduction of DD Bharti.

He retired from service in 2006 as Secretary of the Urban Development Ministry. After retirement, he was actively associated with the planning and implementation of 60,000 crore Jawaharlal Nehru National Urban Renewal Mission (JNNURM) launched by the Manmohan Singh government. He has served on the executive council of the Vivekananda International Foundation think-tank and multiple corporate boards including IDFC bank. He has also served as an advisor, on National e-Governance Advisory Group (NAG); Advisory Group for Integrated Development of Power, Coal, and Renewable Energy; Committee on implementation of Corporate Social Responsibility in the current Narendra Modi government.

Allegations 
On 6 August 2022, Deputy Chief Minister of Delhi Manish Sisodia accused Anil Baijal of corruption. Sisodia said that he has written to the Central Bureau of Investigation (CBI) for a probe into Baijal's decision to open liquor shops in unauthorised colonies. He added that the sudden change in the decision caused losses worth thousands of crores of rupees to the Delhi Government.

References

External links
 Anil Baijal at The Times of India

Year of birth missing (living people)
Living people
University of Allahabad alumni
Alumni of the University of East Anglia
Indian Home Secretaries
Lieutenant Governors of Delhi
Punjabi people
Indian Administrative Service officers